Rockwood is a rural municipality lying north of Winnipeg, Manitoba, Canada. It is part of the Winnipeg Metro Region and had a 2021 census population of 8,440. The independently governed towns of Stonewall and Teulon are both enclaved within Rockwood.

Communities
 Argyle
 Balmoral
 Grosse Isle (part)
 Gunton
 Komarno
 Stony Mountain
  Stonewall

Demographics 

Water 
The R.M. of Rockwood's water is supplied by three wells in operation since 1990.

When the R.M. applied to the Public Utilities Board for water rate increases in the late 2010s, they reported a higher amount of "unaccounted for" water usage of 17% (normal is 10%). Some of this unused water came from water line cleaning, firefighting, and water main breakage. In 2017, 545 new water meters were installed to help reduce the unaccounted for water.

The Stony Mountain Institution water is provided by the separate Cartier Regional Water Co-op.

References

External links
Official site

Rockwood

Rockwood